Model School Rohtak is a private secondary school in Rohtak, Haryana, India. It is a co-educational day  school with around 3,500 students . The school is affiliated to the Central Board of Secondary Education (CBSE), the Indian Public Schools' Conference (IPSC) and the National Progressive Schools' Conference (NPSC).
It was founded in 1952.

History
Model School located in Rohtak, was established in the year 1952. The school is an English medium Co-Educational school affiliated to Central Board of Secondary Education (CBSE). It started with 1 teacher and 7 students but today, this school provides education to 8000+ students by 300+ teachers, with a Teacher-Student ratio of about 30 students for one teacher in its 5 branches in Haryana.

Campus
The school is a co-educational day school with 8,000 students. The school's facilities include two libraries that house 50,000 books in the senior library and 10,000 books in the junior library; a reading room; a video library; school counselling centres; an audio-visual hall; an air-conditioned Seminar Hall, and a Bookshop. The school has laboratories for computing, Physics, Chemistry, Biology, Language, Robotics, and Mathematics.

The Sports Complex has facilities for Volleyball, Cricket, Football, Basketball, Lawn Tennis.

Notable alumni

 Bhupinder Singh Hooda, Former Chief Minister of Haryana
 Deepender Singh Hooda, Member of Parliament (Rajya Sabha)
 Sameer Gehlaut, Billionaire
 Mallika Sherawat, Actress
 Randeep Hooda, Bollywood actor
 Sangram Singh, Wrestler
 Jaideep Ahlawat, Bollywood actor

See also
Education in India
Literacy in India  
List of institutions of higher education in Haryana

References

External links

Central Board of Secondary Education
Private schools in Haryana
Education in Rohtak